The Sea Pines School of Charm and Personality for Young Women was a coed boarding school located in Brewster, Massachusetts from 1907 to 1972. After its closure, it was purchased in 1977 and became known as the Old Sea Pines Inn.

Notable alumni

 Molly Guion

References

Boarding schools in Massachusetts
Brewster, Massachusetts
Private high schools in Massachusetts
Co-educational boarding schools
1907 establishments in Massachusetts
1972 disestablishments in Massachusetts
Educational institutions established in 1907
Educational institutions disestablished in 1972